Morfonou is an area of Mount Athos that belongs to the Monastery of Great Lavra. Located on the eastern side of the Athos peninsula, it is served by a ferry port.

The area of the Cell of Morfonou or Amalfinou derives its name from the former Amalfinon Monastery. In the area, there are 2 active cells and 2 abandoned ones.

References

Populated places in Mount Athos
Great Lavra